Ostler's Plantation is a woodland east of Woodhall Spa, Lincolnshire on Kirkby Moor. It has public access and lies to the west of an open area of Lowland Heath, the Kirkby Moor Nature Reserve; both are noted for having large numbers of adders.

The whole site is open to the public throughout the year, although some areas may be restricted during harvesting. It is a popular area for walking, horse riding and cycling with organised mountain biking and archery events held.

There is no direct access to the adjoining nature reserves from the woodland - these have to be accessed by going back onto Kirkby Lane.

History

19th Century 
The plantation was originally planted in the early 19th century by John Parkinson on an area of open moorland. After his bankruptcy in 1827 his former agent, William Ostler, became its owner.

20th Century 
The majority of the woodland was acquired by the Forestry Commission in 1938 with the south west corner added in 1971. Today managed by Forestry England and still used as a commercial plantation with periodic harvesting.

Second World War 
In 1942 RAF Woodhall Spa was built immediately to the south of the woodland with many of the bomb dumps, aprons and other associated buildings being built into the edge of the woodland. Much of these still remain as tracks and overgrown ruins.

Piri Piri Burr 

The woodland has become home to the invasive Piri Piri Burr (Acaena novae-zelandiae) brought over by airmen from New Zealand during the Second World War. Efforts are underway to control and remove the plant.

Snake bites

On 18 April 2009 a 7-year-old boy was bitten by an adder after handling it while walking in the woods. After receiving hospital treatment at Lincoln County Hospital he made a full recovery; however it reignited concern over the danger of snakes. Although adders are a protected species, many local people believe that there should be adequate warning signs and that they should be under control. A lack of anti-venom has also been highlighted.  Over the past years  a number of dogs have also been bitten.

Fauna and Flora 
Species resident or visitors to the woodland include:

Reptiles 
 Adder (Vipera berus)
 Grass Snake (Natrix helvetica)
 Slow Worm (Anguis fragilis)
 Common Lizard (Zootoca vivipara)

Bats 

 Natterers Bat
 Noctule Bat
 Common Pipestrelle 
 Soprano Pipestrelle Bat
 Brown Long Eared Bat
 Wiskered Bat
 Daubentons Bat
 Barbastelle Bat

References

External links

Forests and woodlands of Lincolnshire